Errol Wylie Galt (born 1984) is an American politician who served as the Speaker of the Montana House of Representatives. As a Republican member of the Montana House of Representatives, he represented the 30th district from 2017 until he was term limited in 2023. He previously served in the Montana House of Representatives from the 83rd district from 2013 to 2015.

Early life
Galt was born in 1984 in Helena, Montana. He received a degree in agriculture business from Montana State University.

References

|-

1984 births
21st-century American politicians
Living people
People from Helena, Montana
Republican Party members of the Montana House of Representatives
Speakers of the Montana House of Representatives